Steven Chambers (born 8 November 1990) is an Australian professional baseball player for the Canberra Cavalry of the Australian Baseball League.

He was a member of the Australia national baseball team in the 2017 World Baseball Classic Qualification and 2016 Haarlem Baseball Week.

On 12 February 2019 he invited for spring training of Yokohama DeNA Bay Stars of Nippon Professional Baseball (NPB) with Steven Kent.

References

External links

 Steven Chambers stats ABL.com

1990 births
Living people
Adelaide Bite players
Australian expatriate baseball players in Japan
Australian expatriate baseball players in the Czech Republic
Baseball pitchers
Brisbane Bandits players
Canberra Cavalry players
Cedar Rapids Kernels players
Sportspeople from the Gold Coast, Queensland